Stuart Bruce Greenwood (born August 12, 1956) is a Canadian actor and producer. He is known for his role as the American president John F. Kennedy in Thirteen Days, for which he won the Satellite Award for Best Supporting Actor – Motion Picture, and as Captain Christopher Pike in J. J. Abrams's Star Trek reboot series. He has been nominated for three Canadian Screen Awards, once for Best Actor (for Elephant Song) and twice for Best Supporting Actor (for The Sweet Hereafter and Being Julia). In television, he starred as Gil Garcetti in The People v. O. J. Simpson: American Crime Story, and has appeared in Mad Men, St. Elsewhere, Knots Landing, and John from Cincinnati. He currently stars as Dr. Randolph Bell in the Amy Holden Jones-created medical drama The Resident.

He has appeared in supporting roles in such films as National Treasure: Book of Secrets, Kingsman: The Golden Circle, Hollywood Homicide, Double Jeopardy, Déjà Vu, I, Robot, Dinner for Schmucks, Capote, The Post and as the motion-capture alien dubbed "Cooper" in Super 8. He is also a voice actor; his voice roles include Chiron in the Canadian animated series Class of the Titans and Bruce Wayne / Batman in Batman: Under the Red Hood, Young Justice, Batman: Gotham by Gaslight and Batman: Death in the Family.

Early life
Greenwood was born in Rouyn-Noranda, Quebec, the son of Mary Sylvia (née Ledingham), a nurse who worked in an extended care unit, and Hugh John Greenwood, a Vancouver-born geophysicist and professor who taught at Princeton University.

Career

Greenwood is known in the United States for his appearances in Star Trek; I, Robot; Double Jeopardy; The Core; Thirteen Days as president John F. Kennedy; Capote as Jack Dunphy, Truman Capote's lover; Eight Below as Professor Davis McClaren; and Firehouse Dog. He is also known for his role in the video game Call of Duty: Modern Warfare 3 as the voice of Overlord.

He had prominent roles in the award-winning Atom Egoyan films Exotica, The Sweet Hereafter, and Ararat. He appeared in the 1980s teen cult film The Malibu Bikini Shop and starred in Mee-Shee: The Water Giant. He played a role in The World's Fastest Indian and also featured in the Bob Dylan biographical film I'm Not There. He appeared in Dinner for Schmucks as the cruel executive who hosts a dinner for "idiots".

On television, Greenwood has appeared on St. Elsewhere (Dr. Seth Griffin, 1986–88) and Knots Landing (Pierce Lawton, 1991–92), and starred in the UPN series Nowhere Man (Thomas Veil, 1995–96). He also guest-starred in one episode of the popular Canadian show Road to Avonlea, for which he won a Gemini Award for "Best Guest Performance in a Series by an Actor".

On June 10, 2007, HBO's John from Cincinnati premiered, starring Greenwood. He also appears as the President of the United States in National Treasure: Book of Secrets. He played Beach Boys drummer Dennis Wilson in Summer Dreams: Story of the Beach Boys. In 2009, he worked with Australian director Bruce Beresford, playing the part of Ben Stevenson (artistic director of Houston Ballet), in the critically acclaimed film Mao's Last Dancer. He voiced Bruce Wayne / Batman in the animated film Batman: Under the Red Hood, the animated series Young Justice, and the animated short film Batman: Death in the Family.

He played the lead role in the horror thriller Cell 213. He was the lead for the Steven Spielberg produced 2012 ABC series The River, and reprised his role as Admiral Christopher Pike for J. J. Abrams' Star Trek Into Darkness. In 2015, he had a recurring role in the last season of Mad Men as Richard Burghoff, a romantic interest for Joan Harris (Christina Hendricks).

Personal life
Greenwood is married to Susan Devlin. They live in Pacific Palisades, a neighbourhood of Los Angeles, California.

Filmography

Film

Television

Video games

Awards and nominations

References

External links
 
 
 

Male actors from Quebec
Anglophone Quebec people
Canadian male film actors
Canadian male television actors
Canadian male voice actors
Living people
People from Rouyn-Noranda
20th-century Canadian male actors
21st-century Canadian male actors
Canadian expatriate male actors in the United States
1956 births